Russell Thornton is a Canadian poet. His book House Built of Rain (2003) was a shortlisted nominee for the 2004 Dorothy Livesay Poetry Prize and the 2004 ReLit Award. His collection Birds, Metals, Stones and Rain (2013) was a shortlisted nominee for the Governor General's Award for English-language poetry at the 2013 Governor General's Awards, the 2014 Raymond Souster Award and the 2014 Dorothy Livesay Poetry Prize. His collection The Hundred Lives (2014) was a shortlisted nominee for the 2015 Griffin Poetry Prize.

He is based in North Vancouver, British Columbia.

Works
  2000 The Fifth Window
  2002 A Tunisian Notebook
  2003 House Built of Rain
  2006 The Human Shore
  2013 Birds, Metals, Stones & Rain
  2014 The Hundred Lives 
  2018 The Broken Face
  2021 Answer to Blue

References

External links 

 Biography, poetry excerpts from Griffin Poetry Prize website
 A Poetic Reconciling of Forces: The Malahat Review Interview with Russell Thornton
 Celebration of Canadian Poetry -- Russell Thornton presented by Bruce Hunter
 Poetry in Voice
 Prism International Interview with Russell Thornton
 Russell Thornton reflects on icons, art and imagination: The Costal Spectator Interview with Russell Thornton
 Rusty Talk With Russell Thornton -- The Rusty Toque Interview with Russell Thornton
 Six Questions with Russell Thornton
 Any Semblance of Departure Will Be a Continuation: An Interview with Russell Thornton
  https://www.readlocalbc.ca/2019/04/09/interview-with-russell-thornton-national-poetry-month/ The Mystery of Where You Come From: An Interview With Russell Thornton
  https://miramichireader.ca/2022/01/the-russell-thornton-interview/ The Russell Thornton Interview

Living people
21st-century Canadian poets
Writers from British Columbia
People from North Vancouver
Canadian male poets
21st-century Canadian male writers
Year of birth missing (living people)